Witthayu Road, commonly known in English as Wireless Road, is a road in Bangkok, located almost entirely in Lumphini Subdistrict of Pathum Wan District.

Witthayu Road originally linked Phloen Chit Road to Rama IV Road, running from what is now Phloen Chit Intersection to Witthayu Intersection, where it continues on as Sathon Road.

Tree-lined and in parts divided into three carriageways, Witthayu Road is one of the greener streets passing through the city centre, as it runs along the length of Lumphini Park, the leafy campuses of the American, Dutch and British Embassies, as well as Nai Lert Park, originally the home of the eponymous Chinese businessman who developed the area in the 1920s. Several other countries also have embassies on the road or within the office towers of All Seasons Place.

The road received its name (which literally means "radio") from the fact that it passed by Saladaeng Station, one of Thailand's earliest radio transmitter stations. The area of the station, on the corner of Witthayu and Rama IV Roads, later became the site of the Armed Forces Academies Preparatory School (1961–2000), then the Suan Lum Night Bazaar (2001–2010). The area, which is served by Lumphini Station of the MRT's Blue Line, is now set to be developed as TCC Group's mixed-use megaproject One Bangkok.

References

Streets in Bangkok
Pathum Wan district